Edward "Ted" Campbell (third ¼ 1943 – 27 July 2015) was an English professional rugby league footballer who played in the 1960s and 1970s.

Background
Ted Campbell's birth was registered in Wakefield, West Riding of Yorkshire, England, and he died after a long illness aged 71 in Royston, South Yorkshire, England.

Playing career

Championship final appearances
Ted Campbell played right-, i.e. number 10, in Wakefield Trinity's 21-9 victory over St. Helens in the Championship Final replay during the 1966–67 season at Station Road, Swinton on Wednesday 10 May 1967.

County Cup Final appearances
Ted Campbell played  left-, i.e. number 8, in Wakefield Trinity's 18-2 victory over Leeds in the 1964 Yorkshire County Cup Final during the 1964–65 season at Fartown Ground, Huddersfield on Saturday 31 October 1964.

Club career
Ted Campbell made his début for Wakefield Trinity during August 1962, he made his last appearance for Wakefield Trinity (in his first spell) during February 1970, made his début for Wakefield Trinity (in his second spell) during February 1973, he made his last appearance for Wakefield Trinity (in his second spell) during the 1975–76 season, he appears to have scored no drop-goals (or field-goals as they are currently known in Australasia), but prior to the 1974–75 season all goals, whether; conversions, penalties, or drop-goals, scored 2-points, consequently prior to this date drop-goals were often not explicitly documented, therefore '0' drop-goals may indicate drop-goals not recorded, rather than no drop-goals scored.

References

External links
Search for "Campbell" at rugbyleagueproject.org
RIP TED CAMPBELL (1943-2015)ĎŔƑ

1943 births
2015 deaths
English rugby league players
Rugby league players from Wakefield
Rugby league props
Wakefield Trinity players
York Wasps players